Haywire Winery is a Canadian Winery located in the Okanagan Valley’s Summerland, British Columbia.  Situated on a 10 acre lot, Haywire sits looking over Okanagan Lake.

History
After purchasing the 10-acre property in 2005, owners Christine Coletta and Steve Lornie grew the existing Red Delicious apples and apricots for one season before switching to Pinot gris in 2006. The pair named the winery Switchback as it celebrated "the switch from losing money as apple growers to losing money as grape growers." The name Haywire comes from wire, originally used for baling hay, which tended to tangle in a chaotic way. The term also describes Coletta and Lornie's transition from city slickers to farmers to winery owners. After the first vintage in 2009, Haywire planned to source other varieties like Pinot noir from other growers in the valley.

Winemaker
Winemaker Matt Dumayne, leads cellar operations with assistance from internationally known winemaking consultant Alberto Antonini. As the consulting oenologist, Antonini assists with winemaking protocols. Both Dumayne and Antonini also work with wine advisor David Scholefield on wine style.

Okanagan Crush Pad
Haywire's Switchback Vineyard is also the home to Okanagan Crush Pad Winery, which is open to the public seasonally.

External links
 http://www.haywirewinery.com  Official Website
 http://www.okanagancrushpad.com Official Parent Company Website

References

Wineries of British Columbia
Canadian companies established in 2009
Food and drink companies established in 2009